The OIC Computer Emergency Response Team, commonly known as OIC-CERT, is a computer emergency response team and one of the 17 affiliated organs of the Organisation of Islamic Cooperation. Focused on global cybersecurity in the 27 member and non-member states, it is considered the world's third-largest computer emergency response team coordinated by the 27 country. The OIC-CERT is primarily focused on providing emergency support in cyber resilience with global collaboration with its associated members and information security organizations. It also encourages member states to implement cybersecurity policies by their respective CERTs.

Chaired by the CyberSecurity Malaysia, national cybersecurity agency, it also serves as the Secretariat of OIC-CERT. Huawei became the first multinational technology corporation to sign the OIC-CERT membership in 2021. Its membership is sponsored by the UAE Computer Emergency Response Team (aeCERT). OIC-CERT maintains a global information and communications technology ecosystem and assisted the nations in preventing cyberattack challenges.

History 
OIC Computer Emergency Response Team was established by an adopting a resolution INF-36/2 in May 2009 by the OIC Council of Foreign Ministers in its 36th session held in Damascus, Syria. The council of foreign affairs granted OIC-CERT the status of affiliated institution in the same year.

Code of Ethics 
Code of Ethics are the fundamental elements of the organisation that determine the status, cybercrime behaviour and membership by its Steering Committee. It regulates the information security organizations and the member states under four Code of Ethics.

Objectives 
Established for global cooperation between the cybersecurity organisation within the framework of the Charter of the Organisation of Islamic Cooperation, its main activities are focused on promoting and building the relationship between the member states in cybersecurity sector, in addition to exchanging information and minimising cyberterrorism, and cybercrime. It also conduct educational and internet security awareness programmes in cybersecurity sector and provides cooperation technology research and development.

The OIC-CERT objectively works on two principles such as capacity building and infrastructure programmes which are financially aided by the member states and the Islamic Development Bank. Financial assistance model is jointly managed by the Organization of American States and the Asia Pacific Team.

The OIC-CERT also regulates 5G Security Working Group (WG) that maintains 5G technology within the scope of OIC Charter. The WG also conducts competition programmes concerning 5G.

Members

References

Further reading 
 

Organisation of Islamic Cooperation affiliated agencies
2009 establishments in Syria
Computer security organizations
Information governance
Intergovernmental organizations
International organisations based in Malaysia
Organisations based in Selangor
Organizations established in 2009
Computer emergency response teams